DT1 multiple unit is a passenger train developed at the Torzhoksky car-building factory in Russia in 2007.
The train has electric and diesel power, and is intended to be used for suburban transport on  gauge railways, with both low and high passenger platforms in macroclimatic areas with a temperate climate.

It has 370 seats, with a total capacity of 878 passengers.

Train operating

Russian railways have started structure in pre-production operation on a line of Saint Petersburg - Pskov, it was named "Pleskov".
The train ran on a route of the express train from Baltiysky Rail Terminal, two trains it was maintained.

The volume of purchases of these trains can be increased in 2009. Russian Railways considers a purchase question multiple units for directions from Saint Petersburg to Gdov, Sortavala, and Primorsk (through station Ushkovo).

See also
 The Museum of the Moscow Railway, at Paveletsky Rail Terminal, Moscow
 Rizhsky Rail Terminal, home of the Moscow Railway Museum
 Varshavsky Rail Terminal, St.Petersburg, former home of the Central Museum of Railway Transport, Russian Federation
 History of rail transport in Russia

References

External links

  In article technical characteristics and the description of the design of structure are given.

Electric multiple units of Russia
Diesel multiple units of Russia
Articles containing video clips